2nd to None (also known as ELVIIS: 2nd to None) is a collection of songs by American rock and roll musician Elvis Presley. The album was released by on October 7, 2003 by RCA Records as the sequel to the previous year's highly successful ELV1S: 30 #1 Hits.

The album included Elvis's #1 singles that did not appear on the previous release, other notable recordings by the artist, one previously unreleased recording ("I'm a Roustabout") and a remix of "Rubberneckin'" by Paul Oakenfold.

Although not as successful as its predecessor, 2nd to None made the top 10 in at least nine countries and received certifications in several regions.

Production, artwork and packaging 
2nd to None was produced by Ernst Mikael Jorgensen and Ray Bardani. Bardani also mixing many of the songs on the collection with the assistance of Matt Snedecor, while the tape transferring and mastering on the recordings were handled by Andreas Meyer and Vic Anesini, respectively.

The release's primary artwork consists of a picture of Elvis' head and the number 2 against a black background. The release's art direction and design was handled by Mike Jurkovac. The artwork and design for the European release of the album was different, being very similar to ELV1S and having the art direction and design by the same person, Thomas Vasquez.

Track listing

Charts and certifications

Weekly charts

Year-end charts

Certifications

Promotion 

To promote the album in the United Kingdom, a compilation album titled Before Anyone Did Anything, Elvis Did Everything was released as a free covermount album in the British newspaper Daily Mail.
The album contains a blue cover quite similar to that of 2nd to None and ELV1S and ten songs, although not all of these are from 2nd to None, as some are from 30 #1 Hits and various other releases like the Close Up box set.

Track listing

References 

2003 greatest hits albums
Elvis Presley compilation albums
RCA Records compilation albums
Albums produced by Sam Phillips
Compilation albums published posthumously
Sequel albums